Senator Ferry may refer to:

Members of the United States Senate
Orris S. Ferry (1823–1875), U.S. Senator from Connecticut
Thomas W. Ferry (1827–1896), U.S. Senator from Michigan

United States state senate members
Miles Ferry (1932–2017), Utah State Senate
W. Mont Ferry (1871–1938), Utah State Senate
William H. Ferry (1819–1880), New York State Senate